"In Those Jeans" a song by American singer Ginuwine. It was written by Harvey "The Rook" Hester along with the singer for his fourth studio album The Senior (2003), while production was helmed by Jerry "Juke" Vines, featuring co-production from Hester and Ginuwine. Released as the album's second single, it became his third and final top 10 single on the US Billboard Hot 100 to date, peaking at number eight. The official remix of "In Those Jeans" features rapper Grafh.

Track listing

Credits and personnel
Credits lifted from the liner notes of The Senior.

Ginuwine – co-producer, vocals, writer
Harvey "The Rook" Hester – co-producer, writer
Jean-Marie Horvat – mixer
Scott Kieklak – recording engineer

Scott Storch – drum programming
Javier Valverde – recording assistant
Jerry "Juke" Vines – producer

Charts

Weekly charts

Year-end charts

Certifications

References

Ginuwine songs
2003 singles
Songs written by Ginuwine
Music videos directed by Chris Robinson (director)